The Continental Group Of Institutes (or CGI) is a group of colleges in Jalvehra, India, established in 2000. Located near Chandigarh, India, CGI is affiliated with Top Colleges of Canada and also with Punjab Technical University, Maharaja Ranjit Singh Punjab Technical University, and Punjabi University

Profile 
CGI began offering courses in 2009.  Since its inception, CGI has established institutes in the fields of Engineering, Computer Science & Application, IT, Commerce and Management at both graduate and undergraduate levels. The Continental Group focuses on providing a wide variety of academic courses, including post-graduate and undergraduate courses in international and domestic affairs. The college is divided into 5 blocks covering different areas of study.
1: Admission Block
2: Engineering Block
3: International Studies Block
4: Higher Education Block
5: High School Block
NBA Accreditation

Awards 
CGI was awarded Best College by ABP (an Indian news channel) for Best Faculty in various disciplines of engineering and other areas  and is 7the Top Colleges in Chandigarh According to the Surey 2015-2016

Courses

Under Graduate Programs 
 Bachelor of Computer Application - BCA
 Bachelor of Business Administration - BBA
 Bachelor of Commerce
 BSc (Fashion Technology)
 Bachelor of Arts- BA

Post Graduate Programs 
 PGDCA
 Master of Commerce
 Master of (Fashion Technology)

B.Tech 
 B.Tech. (Computer Science & Engineering.)
 B.Tech. (Mechanical Engineering.)
 B.Tech. (Electronics & Communication Engineering.)
 B.Tech. (Civil Engineering)

Diploma 
 Diploma in Mechanical
 Diploma in Electronics & Communication

Post Graduate 
 Master Business Administration (MBA)
 M.Tech. (Mechanical Engineering)

SENIOR SECONDARY DIVISION 

 Medical (PCB)
 Non-Medical (PCM)
 Arts
 Commerce

International Studies 
 Computing Science Diploma (CSD) Leading to Bachelor of Computing Science-TRU, Canada
 Mechanical Engineering Technology– Automotive Manufacturing Certificate Program (META)-GC, Canada
 Mechanical Technician-Precision Skills Certificate Program (MTPS)-GC, Canada
 Automotive Business Certificate Program (AUBU)-GC, Canada
 Business Certificate -Saskatchewan Polytechnic, Canada
 Aviation Management, Georgian College, Canada
 Interactive Web Design and Development-Georgian College, Canada
 Hotel & Restaurant Management Program Saskatchewan Polytechnic, Saskatchewan, Canada.
 Electronics Engineering Technology-Telecommunications System-Conestoga college, Canada
 Foundation in Biotechnology (FBT) -Red River College, Canada
 Business Programs
 Trades & Technology
 Computers & IT
 Health Science
 Tourism

Placements 
Many companies, such as Tata Motors, Axis Bank, Sonalika International, Airtel, Ashok Leyland, Dell, Polaris, SAP labs, Adobe Systems, Perot Systems, Iris Software, Citrix Systems, Oracle, M.Tech. Mahindra, etc., visit the campus every year.

External links 
 Continental Group Of College website
 Continental Group Of Engineering Technology
 https://www.facebook.com/cgieducation/

References 

Universities and colleges in Punjab, India